Classic Stories 2: From A Medicine for Melancholy and S Is for Space is a semi-omnibus edition of two short story collections by American writer Ray Bradbury, A Medicine for Melancholy and S is for Space.  Stories from the original collections that are included in Classic Stories 1 are omitted.

In 1998, Avon Books reprinted this collection as A Medicine for Melancholy and Other Stories.

Contents
 "In a Season of Calm Weather"
 "A Medicine for Melancholy"
 "The Wonderful Ice Cream Suit"
 "Fever Dream"
 "The Marriage Mender"
 "The Town Where No One Got Off"
 "A Scent of Sarsaparilla"
 "The Headpiece"
 "The First Night of Lent"
 "The Time of Going Away"
 "All Summer in a Day"
 "The Gift"
 "The Great Collision of Monday Last"
 "The Little Mice"
 "The Shoreline at Sunset"
 "The Day It Rained Forever"
 "Chrysalis"
 "Pillar of Fire"
 "Zero Hour"
 "The Man"
 "Time in Thy Flight"
 "The Pedestrian"
 "Hail and Farewell"
 "Invisible Boy"
 "Come into My Cellar"
 "The Million-Year Picnic"
 "The Screaming Woman"
 "The Smile"
 "Dark They Were, and Golden-Eyed"
 "The Trolley"
 "Icarus Montgolfier Wright"

References

External links
 
 
 

1990 short story collections
Short story collections by Ray Bradbury
Books with cover art by Don Maitz